Hamid Pourhashemi (born 3 June 1990) is an Iranian cyclist, who most recently rode for UCI Continental team .

Major results
2016
 3rd Overall Tour of Fuzhou
1st Stage 1
 10th Tour of Almaty
2017
 1st Mountains classification Tour de Kumano
 3rd Overall Tour of Japan
2018
 1st Stage 3 Tour of Mesopotamia

References

External links

1990 births
Living people
Iranian male cyclists
People from Sanandaj
21st-century Iranian people